Amauris hecate, the dusky Danaid, scarce monk or black friar, is a species of butterfly of the family Nymphalidae. It is found in Africa, from Guinea and Liberia to Ghana, Cameroun, Angola, Zaire, Uganda, Southern Sudan and Western Kenya and Southern Ethiopia.

Subspecies
Amauris hecate hecate (Guinea, Liberia to Ghana, Cameroon, Angola, Zaire, Uganda, Southern Sudan and Western Kenya)
Amauris hecate stictica Rothschild & Jordan, 1903 (Southern Ethiopia)

References

Seitz, A. Die Gross-Schmetterlinge der Erde 13: Die Afrikanischen Tagfalter. Plate XIII 24

Amauris
Butterflies of Africa
Lepidoptera of West Africa
Butterflies described in 1866
Taxa named by Arthur Gardiner Butler